The XII Corps fought from northern France to Austria in World War II. Constituted in the Organized Reserves in 1933, it was activated on 29 August 1942 at Columbia, South Carolina. XII Corps became operational in France as part of Lieutenant General George S. Patton's Third Army on 1 August 1944. Initially commanded by Major General Gilbert R. Cook, bad health forced MG Cook to relinquish command to Major General Manton S. Eddy within three weeks. MG Eddy commanded the corps until late April 1945, when his own health problems forced him to turn over command to MG Stafford LeRoy Irwin.

Pursuit across northern France
Assembling south of Le Mans on 13 August 1944, XII Corps began driving eastward and liberated the cities of Orléans and Châteaudun within five days. Moving rapidly against disorganized German resistance, the corps rapidly took Sens, Montargis, Troyes, Châlons-sur-Marne, and Vitry-le-François. By 31 August 1944, XII Corps had seized a bridgehead over the Meuse River at Commercy in Lorraine.

Lorraine
At the beginning of September 1944, serious gasoline shortages forced an abrupt halt to General Patton's pursuit across northern France. Resuming its advance on 4 September, but facing shortages of gasoline and ammunition because of the allied logistical crisis, XII Corps now confronted a vastly changed tactical situation. A combination of German reinforcements and regained cohesion in the German forces (5th Panzer Army) confronting the U.S. Third Army resulted in dramatically increased German resistance in the region of Metz and Nancy in the Moselle River valley. From the German point of view, Lorraine (German: Lothringen) was seen as part of Germany and would be defended with bitter determination.

Across the Moselle
XII Corps assaulted across the Moselle River at Dieulouard on 13 September 1944, and heavy fighting ensued for three days as the Germans attempted to collapse the bridgehead. During 15–16 September, the corps liberated Nancy and Lunéville. The advance of XII Corps was met by an armored counterattack of the 5th Panzer Army. At Arracourt during 19–20 September 1944, the corps' U.S. 4th Armored Division destroyed two German Panzer brigades. Desperate fighting continued until 1 October 1944 for the area around Arracourt, Moyenvic, and Grémecey's forest. Resuming its advance, the corps pushed to the river Seille by 9 October 1944.

To the Saar
After resting and reorganizing for a month, XII Corps opened an offensive to reach the Saar River on 8 November 1944. Château-Salins was taken on 9 November, and the corps battled through firm German resistance to liberate Faulquemont on 20 November 1944. On 24 November, the corps crossed the Sarre River and then liberated Saint-Avold on 27 November 1944. From 1 to 11 December 1944, XII Corps fought for, and liberated the towns of Sarre-Union and Sarreguemines. On 12 December, the corps entered Germany and began operations against the Siegfried Line fortifications.

Ardennes
Germany's surprise offensive into the Ardennes on 16 December 1944, resulted in the U.S. Third Army being moved northward to attack the southern flank of the German army in Belgium and Luxembourg. Turning over its part of the front to the U.S. XV Corps, XII Corps moved to the area of Luxembourg city on 21 December 1944. Subsequently, the corps cleared the west bank of the Moselle River in Luxembourg until 11 January 1945. During 18–23 January, XII Corps assaulted across the Sauer River and cleared the twin confluences of the Our River and the Sauer, and then that of the Sauer and Moselle Rivers.

Into Germany
On 7 February 1945, the corps assaulted across the Our and Sauer Rivers between Vianden and Echternach, repelling German counter-attacks against the bridgeheads and gradually clearing Siegfried Line bunkers in the area until 15 February. On 18 February 1945, XII Corps drove on the Prüm River, which it assaulted across on the night of 24–25 February. Bitburg fell to XII Corps on 28 February 1945. The corps assaulted across the Kyll River on the night of 2–3 March 1945, and reached the Rhine River in the area of Andernach on 7 March. From 7–11 March 1945, the corps mopped up along the west bank of the Rhine and Moselle Rivers.

Across the Rhine
Assaulting across the Moselle River at Treis on 14 March 1945, the corps seized Bad Kreuznach on 18 March and Worms on 21 March. On 22 March 1945, XII Corps assaulted across the Rhine River at Oppenheim without involved preparation and caught the Germans in the area off-guard. From 21 to 27 March, the corps battled for, and seized Mainz. On 25 March, Darmstadt fell to XII Corps. Against the wishes of MG Eddy, General Patton ordered the XII Corps to dispatch a raiding force (Task Force Baum) to liberate the Hammelburg prisoner of war camp on 25 March. TF Baum was trapped and destroyed near Hammelburg on 27 March 1945. On 26 March 1945, the corps assaulted across the Main River into Frankfurt am Main, and fought for three days to capture the city in the face of German resistance characterized by the use of assault guns and a heavy concentration of Flak artillery in the dense urban environment. Moving rapidly northeast, the corps bypassed German troop concentrations and conquered Hanau (28 March), Bad Hersfeld (31 March), and Fulda (2 April). The corps paused between Gotha and Suhl on 3 April 1945. On 4 April 1945 XII Corps troops discovered a Nazi stash of art treasures and gold in a salt mine at Merkers, and then took Meiningen the following day.

A curious decision
In a questionable allocation of allied military strength, Generals Dwight D. Eisenhower (supreme allied commander) and Omar Bradley (commander of U.S. 12th Army Group) paused 12th Army Group's (to which the U.S. Third Army belonged) advance at the Elbe River and then committed the U.S. Third Army, the U.S. Seventh Army and the French First Army to overrun what they believed was an "Alpine Redoubt" in the south of Germany. The so-called redoubt proved to be a myth and the commitment of eight U.S. and French army corps against it was a curious use of allied military resources while other allied armies in the north paused for weeks only 80 miles from the true heart of German resistance, Berlin.

Final operations
This decision committed XII Corps to an advance to the southeast. Taking Coburg on 11 April 1945, the corps then took Bayreuth in a three-day battle ending on 16 April. Moving rapidly, XII Corps liberated the Flossenburg concentration camp on 23 April and reached the Danube River on 25 April 1945. Operating simultaneously in Germany and Czechoslovakia, the corps crossed into Austria and assaulted across the Danube River southwest of Regensburg on 26 April 1945. The corps seized Linz on 4–5 May 1945, and began clearing passes in Czechoslovakia for a drive on Prague. VE Day brought a close to combat operations for the XII Corps, as the corps linked up with Red Army troops near Amstetten.

Campaign credits and inactivation
XII Corps is credited with service in the Northern France, Rhineland, Ardennes-Alsace, and Central Europe campaigns. Headquarters, XII Corps, was inactivated on 15 December 1945 in Germany. The corps was subsequently activated and inactivated several times, with the last inactivation occurring on 1 April 1968 at Atlanta, Georgia.

Commanders
Major General William H. Simpson (September, 1942 - October, 1943)
Major General Gilbert R. Cook (1 November 1943 - 18 August 1944)
Major General Manton S. Eddy (19 August 1944 - 19 April 1945)
Major General Stafford LeRoy Irwin (20 April 1945 - September, 1945)

References 

 Weigley, Russell F. (1981).  Eisenhower's Lieutenants. Bloomington: Indiana University Press. .
 Williams, Mary H., compiler (1958).  U.S. Army in World War II, Chronology 1941–1945. Washington D.C.: Government Printing Office.
 Wilson, John B., compiler (1999).  Armies, Corps, Divisions, and Separate Brigades. Washington D.C.: Government Printing Office. .

Recommended readings
George Dyer, XII Corps: Spearhead of Patton's Third Army, XII Corps History Association, 1947

Corps of the United States in World War II
Corps of the United States Army
Military units and formations established in 1942
1942 establishments in the United States
Military units and formations disestablished in 1945